Antaeotricha radicalis is a moth in the family Depressariidae. It was described by Philipp Christoph Zeller in 1877. It is found in Panama.

References
2. https://www.acguanacaste.ac.cr/paginas-de-especies/insectos/123-depressariidae/5480-i-antaeotricha-radicalis-i-depressariidae

Moths described in 1877
radicalis
Moths of Central America